FC Olimpik Donetsk is a Ukrainian inactive football team based in Donetsk, Ukraine. The club currently doesn't play in any Ukrainian competition due to the 2022 Russian invasion of Ukraine. Since its promotion to Ukrainian Premier League in 2014, it played its games in Kyiv due to the war in Donbas. During the 2016–17 Ukrainian Premier League, there were attempts to move the club either to Sumy or Cherkasy, which were never realized.

History
The football club Olimpik Donetsk was formed in 2001 along with a charity regional fund of football development.

The club was meant to rely on players from its academy. Olimpik Donetsk entered the professional competition in 2004. After six seasons Druha Liha Olympik became champions in the 2010–11 season and were promoted to the Persha Liha. Olympik became the champions of the 2013–14 Ukrainian First League and earned promotion to the Ukrainian Premier League. They play at their stadium "Olimpik".

The clubs has several youth teams that play in youth competitions under the name "Olimpik-UOR" (Olimpik – Uchylyshche of Olympiyskoho Rezervu). Since 2009, UOR Donetsk and Olimpik have agreement about mutual training of young footballers.

Since its promotion to the Ukrainian Premier League in 2014, the club is forced to play its games in Kyiv.

The Olimpik Donetsk participation in the 2019–20 season was under question because both of its youth teams (U-21 and U-19) were expelled from the Ukrainian Premier League due to match fixing, and are banned from competitions until the end of 2019–20 season. One of the conditions to receive a season license in UPL was presence of youth teams in a club. The league members voted to keep Olimpik's senior team in the league, yet final decision was reserved for the UAF (formerly FFU) Executive Committee. On 18 June 2019, the UAF Executive Committee approved the League's decision about Olimpik and later explained that it made changes to its regulations where clubs will not be penalized for having its youth teams banned from the UPL competitions as long as the club will sponsor other youth teams. On 9 July 2019 Olimpik filed a lawsuit against UAF to the Court of Arbitration for Sport about falsification of a case against the club and sanctions that were introduced against the club. At the end of July in media appeared information that the club might have withdrawn its lawsuit from the CAS.

In July 2021, the president of the club Vladyslav Helzin announced that the club is withdrawing from all competitions for the 2021/22 season and suspends its activities.

Infrastructures
The main ground in Sports Complex Olimpik in Donetsk, but due to the War in Donbas, from 2014 until 2016 the team was moved to Bannikov Stadium in Kyiv. From August 2016 until December 2016 the team played in the Yuvileiny Stadium in Sumy. In 2016, due to COVID-19 pandemic the team played in Stadion Yuri Gagarin in Chernihiv  and then to Lobanovsky Dynamo Stadium, Kyiv in the same year. On 5 October 2021 the club played in Yunist Stadium in Chernihiv for the Ukrainian First League for the season 2021-22 in the option to play all season.

Honours
 Ukrainian First League
 Winners: 2013–14
 Ukrainian Second League – Group B
 Winners: 2010–11

League and cup history

{|class="wikitable"
|-bgcolor="#efefef"
! Season
! Div.
! Pos.
! Pl.
! W
! D
! L
! GS
! GA
! P
!Domestic Cup
!colspan=2|Europe
!Notes
|-bgcolor=SteelBlue
|align=center|2004
|align=center|4th (1st round)(Amatory)
|align=center|4
|align=center|6
|align=center|1
|align=center|2
|align=center|3
|align=center|9
|align=center|14
|align=center|5
|align=center bgcolor=grey rowspan=2|
|align=center bgcolor=grey colspan=2 rowspan=12|
|align=center|obtained professional status during season
|-bgcolor=PowderBlue
|align=center|2004–05
|align=center rowspan=7|3rd "B"(Druha Liha)
|align=center|11
|align=center|28
|align=center|8
|align=center|3
|align=center|17
|align=center|33
|align=center|54
|align=center|27
|align=center|
|-bgcolor=PowderBlue
|align=center|2005–06
|align=center|5
|align=center|24
|align=center|13
|align=center|2
|align=center|9
|align=center|42
|align=center|28
|align=center|41
|align=center|1/32 finals
|align=center|
|-bgcolor=PowderBlue
|align=center|2006–07
|align=center|10
|align=center|28
|align=center|8
|align=center|8
|align=center|12
|align=center|35
|align=center|41
|align=center|32
|align=center|1/16 finals
|align=center|
|-bgcolor=PowderBlue
|align=center|2007–08
|align=center|6
|align=center|34
|align=center|19
|align=center|6
|align=center|9
|align=center|66
|align=center|41
|align=center|63
|align=center|1/16 finals
|align=center|
|-bgcolor=PowderBlue
|align=center|2008–09
|align=center|6
|align=center|34
|align=center|16
|align=center|9
|align=center|9
|align=center|55
|align=center|32
|align=center|57
|align=center|1/32 finals
|align=center|
|-bgcolor=PowderBlue
|align=center|2009–10
|align=center|5
|align=center|26
|align=center|15
|align=center|4
|align=center|7
|align=center|45
|align=center|28
|align=center|49
|align=center|1/64 finals
|align=center|
|-bgcolor=PowderBlue
|align=center|2010–11
|align=center bgcolor=gold|1
|align=center|22
|align=center|17
|align=center|2
|align=center|3
|align=center|45
|align=center|15
|align=center|53
|align=center|1/32 finals
|align=center bgcolor=green|Promoted
|-bgcolor=LightCyan
|align=center|2011–12
|align=center rowspan=3|2nd(Persha Liha)
|align=center|12
|align=center|34
|align=center|11
|align=center|7
|align=center|16
|align=center|38
|align=center|44
|align=center|40
|align=center|1/32 finals
|align=center| 
|-bgcolor=LightCyan
|align=center|2012–13
|align=center|11
|align=center|34 	
|align=center|15 	
|align=center|4 	
|align=center|15 	
|align=center|34 	
|align=center|37 	
|align=center|49
|align=center|1/32 finals
|align=center|
|-bgcolor=LightCyan
|align=center|2013–14
|align=center bgcolor=gold|1
|align=center|30
|align=center|16
|align=center|7
|align=center|7
|align=center|45
|align=center|33
|align=center|55
|align=center|1/32 finals
|align=center bgcolor=green|Promoted
|-
| align="center" |2014–15
| align="center" rowspan=7|1st(Premier Liha)
| align="center" |8
| align="center" |26
| align="center" |7
| align="center" |5
| align="center" |14
| align="center" |24
| align="center" |64
| align="center" |26
|align=center bgcolor=tan|1/2 finals
| align="center" |
|-
| align="center" |2015–16
| align="center" |9
| align="center" |26 	
| align="center" |6 	
| align="center" |7 	
| align="center" |13 	
| align="center" |22 	
| align="center" |35 	
| align="center" |25
| align="center" |1/8 finals
| align="center" |
| align="center" |
| align="center" |
|-
| align="center" |2016–17
| align="center" |4
| align="center" |32	
| align="center" |11	
| align="center" |11	
| align="center" |10
| align="center" |33	
| align="center" |44	
| align="center" |44    
| align="center" |1/16 finals
| align="center" |
| align="center" |
| align="center" |
|-
| align="center" |2017–18
| align="center" |9
| align="center" |32
| align="center" |9	
| align="center" |9	
| align="center" |14
| align="center" |29	
| align="center" |38	
| align="center" |36  
| align="center" | finals
| align="center" |EL
| align="center" |3Q
| align="center" |
|-
| align="center" |2018–19
| align="center" |9
| align="center" |32	
| align="center" |7	
| align="center" |13	
| align="center" |12
| align="center" |41	
| align="center" |48	
| align="center" |34   
| align="center" | finals
| align="center" |
| align="center" |
| align="center" |
|-
| align="center" |2019–20
| align="center" |9
| align="center" |32	
| align="center" |10
| align="center" |6
| align="center" |16
| align="center" |32
| align="center" |47
| align="center" |36
| align="center" | finals
| align="center" |
| align="center" |
| align="center" |
|-
| align="center" |2020–21
| align="center" |13
| align="center" |26	
| align="center" |6
| align="center" |4	
| align="center" |16
| align="center" |28
| align="center" |48	
| align="center" |22  
| align="center" | finals
| align="center" |
| align="center" |
|align=center bgcolor=red|Relegated
|}

European record

Players

Current squad

Out on loan

Coaches and administration

Presidents and other officials

Presidents
 2001–2021: Vladyslav Helzin

General directors
 2017 – present Oleksiy Antonov

Executive directors
 2017 – present Dmytro Andreyev

Sports directors
 2001 – 2017 Oleksiy Antonov
 2019 – present Maksym Kovalenko

Directors
 2006 – 2019 Oleksandr Protsiv

Managers

See also
 Serhiy Bubka College of Olympic Reserve, formerly a school of Olympic Reserve in Donetsk (UOR Donetsk)

Notes and references

External links

  Official website of club 

 
Ukrainian First League clubs
Football clubs in Donetsk
2001 establishments in Ukraine
Association football clubs established in 2001
Football clubs in Kyiv
Sports team relocations